Pony books, pony stories or pony fiction form a genre in children's literature of stories featuring children, teenagers, ponies and horses, and the learning of equestrian skills, especially at a pony club or riding school.

Development of genre

The 1877 novel Black Beauty, although about a horse and not a pony, is seen as a forerunner of pony book fiction.

Pony books themselves began to appear in the late 1920s. In 1928 British lifestyle magazine Country Life published Golden Gorse's The Young Rider which went to a second edition in 1931, and a third in 1935. In the preface to the third edition, the author wrote: "Since then the outlook on children and their ponies has changed very much for the better." She also noted an increase in equestrian pastimes: "Five children seem to be learning to ride today for one who was learning seven years ago."

Critical commentary

The pony book genre is "frequently deemed idealistic," "cater[ing] for those typical fantasies of perfect friendship with an idealized companion."

A critic noted in 1996 that the genre had "been relegated firmly to the sidelines".

A 2009 article posed whether readers of pony-series fiction could do more than simply get another book in the series, much as a young collector of My Little Pony toys would be compelled to add to their collection. The article noted an alternative view of the value of pony fiction; it introduces young readers to wider literature.

Authors of pony books

 Belinda Rapley
 Enid Bagnold
 Kitty Barne
 Gillian Baxter
 Judith M Berrisford
 Jeanne Betancourt
 Bonnie Bryant
 Joanna Cannan
 Joanna Campbell
 Sheila Chapman
 Peter Clover
 Primrose Cumming
 Walter Farley
 Ruby Ferguson
 Mary Gervaise
 Golden Gorse
 Marguerite Henry
 Patricia Leitch
 Jenny Oldfield
 Hazel M Peel
 K. M. Peyton
 Christine Pullein-Thompson
 Diana Pullein-Thompson
 Josephine Pullein-Thompson
 Stacy Gregg
 Allen W. Seaby
 Pat Smythe
 Mary Treadgold
 Will James
 Kristen Atkins
 The pair of schoolgirls, Katharine Hull and Pamela Whitlock, who wrote The Far-Distant Oxus (1937)

See also

References

Children's books